The 2017 Hawaii Bowl was a post-season American college football bowl game played on December 24, 2017, at Aloha Stadium in Honolulu, Hawaii.  The sixteenth edition of the Hawaii Bowl featured the Houston Cougars from the American Athletic Conference against the Fresno State Bulldogs from the Mountain West Conference.  The game was one of the 2017–18 bowl games concluding the 2017 FBS football season. Fresno State defeated Houston, 33–27.

Teams
Fresno State entered the game with a 9–4 overall record (7–2 in conference), while Houston entered the game with an overall record of 7–4 (5–3 in conference). This was the first meeting between the schools.

Fresno State Bulldogs

Houston Cougars

Game summary

Scoring summary

Statistics

References

2017–18 NCAA football bowl games
2017
2017
2017
2017 in sports in Hawaii
December 2017 sports events in the United States